Yathrakkoduvil (English:At the end of the journey) is a Malayalam movie starring Sreejith Vijay and Thilakan among others. It is directed by Basil Zac. The movie was released on 11 January 2013

Plot
Yathrakkoduvil movie, is telling the story of seven friends who get together after their college life. They joined again by leaving all the relation they have before and after the college life is to attend the marriage function of one of them. The incidents happened during the joyful journey arranged by the groom to his home is the core of this story.

Cast

Sreejith Vijay    as Sharath
 Vidya                as Sana
Thilakan          as Ravi
 Devan as David
 Ramu                 as Vishwambaran
 Sani Naryan
 Vidya
 Navami
 Navaneeth
 Prathish

References

External links 
 

2010s Malayalam-language films